Alexander "Sandy" Munro Davie   (born 4 April 1946 in Dundee) is a Scottish mathematician and was the chess champion of Scotland in 1964, 1966, and 1969.

He grew up in Dundee, attending the High School of Dundee, and he was encouraged to play chess by Nancy Elder. He was the Scottish Chess Association's Scottish Boys' Champion in 1960 and 1962. He won the Scottish Chess Championship for 1964, 1966, and 1969 and in 1966 was a member of the Scottish team at the 13th World Student Team Chess Championship at Örebro, Sweden. His last FIDE rating was 2280.

Davie received his PhD in 1970 from the University of Dundee. In 1973 he was elected a Fellow of the Royal Society of Edinburgh. He became a professor of mathematics at the University of Edinburgh, where he is currently retired. His mathematical research deals with dynamical systems and stochastic analysis. He also has "some interest in applications of analysis to PDE, complexity of matrix multiplication and applications of mathematics to biology, particularly protein folding." In 1986 he was an invited speaker at the International Congress of Mathematicians in Berkeley, California.

Selected publications
 
 
 
 
 
 
 
 
 
 
 
 
 
 
 
 
  2007

References

1946 births
Living people
People educated at the High School of Dundee
Alumni of the University of Dundee
Academics of the University of Edinburgh
20th-century Scottish mathematicians
21st-century Scottish mathematicians
Dynamical systems theorists
Probability theorists
Fellows of the Royal Society of Edinburgh
People from Dundee
Scottish chess players